An electromagnetic field (also EM field or EMF) is a classical (i.e. non-quantum) field produced by moving electric charges. It is the field described by classical electrodynamics (a classical field theory) and is the classical counterpart to the quantized electromagnetic field tensor in quantum electrodynamics (a quantum field theory). The electromagnetic field propagates at the speed of light (in fact, this field can be identified as light) and interacts with charges and currents. Its quantum counterpart is one of the four fundamental forces of nature (the others are gravitation, weak interaction and strong interaction).

The field can be viewed as the combination of an electric field and a magnetic field. The electric field is produced by stationary charges, and the magnetic field by moving charges (electric currents); these two are often described as the sources of the field. The way in which charges and currents interact with the electromagnetic field is described by Maxwell's equations (which also describes how time-varying field can produce other fields, and explains why electromagnetic radiation doesn't need any medium for propagation) and the Lorentz force law.

From a classical perspective in the history of electromagnetism, the electromagnetic field can be regarded as a smooth, continuous field, propagated in a wavelike manner. By contrast, from the perspective of quantum field theory, this field is seen as quantized; meaning that the free quantum field (i.e. non-interacting field) can be expressed as the Fourier sum of creation and annihilation operators in energy-momentum space while the effects of the interacting quantum field may be analyzed in perturbation theory via the S-matrix with the aid of a whole host of mathematical techniques such as the Dyson series, Wick's theorem, correlation functions, time-evolution operators, Feynman diagrams etc. In general, the frequency  of the quantized field can be any value above zero, and therefore the value of the energy quantum (photon) can be any value above zero, or even vary continuously in time.

Structure
The electromagnetic field may be viewed in two distinct ways: a continuous structure or a discrete structure.

Continuous structure
Classically, electric and magnetic fields are thought of as being produced by smooth motions of charged objects. For example, oscillating charges produce variations in electric and magnetic fields that may be viewed in a 'smooth', continuous, wavelike fashion. In this case, energy is viewed as being transferred continuously through the electromagnetic field between any two locations. For instance, the metal atoms in a radio transmitter appear to transfer energy continuously. This view is useful to a certain extent (radiation of low frequency), however, problems are found at high frequencies (see ultraviolet catastrophe).

Discrete structure
The electromagnetic field may be thought of in a more 'coarse' way. Experiments reveal that in some circumstances electromagnetic energy transfer is better described as being carried in the form of packets called quanta with a fixed frequency. Planck's relation links the photon energy E of a photon to its frequency f through the equation: 

Although modern quantum optics tells us that there also is a semi-classical explanation of the photoelectric effect—the emission of electrons from metallic surfaces subjected to electromagnetic radiation—the photon was historically (although not strictly necessarily) used to explain certain observations. It is found that increasing the intensity of the incident radiation (so long as one remains in the linear regime) increases only the number of electrons ejected, and has almost no effect on the energy distribution of their ejection. Only the frequency of the radiation is relevant to the energy of the ejected electrons.

This quantum picture of the electromagnetic field (which treats it as analogous to harmonic oscillators) has proven very successful, giving rise to quantum electrodynamics, a quantum field theory describing the interaction of electromagnetic radiation with charged matter. It also gives rise to quantum optics, which is different from quantum electrodynamics in that the matter itself is modelled using quantum mechanics rather than quantum field theory.

Dynamics
In the past, electrically charged objects were thought to produce two different, unrelated types of field associated with their charge property. An electric field is produced when the charge is stationary with respect to an observer measuring the properties of the charge, and a magnetic field as well as an electric field is produced when the charge moves, creating an electric current with respect to this observer. Over time, it was realized that the electric and magnetic fields are better thought of as two parts of a greater whole—the electromagnetic field. Until 1820, when the Danish physicist H. C. Ørsted showed the effect of electric current on a compass needle, electricity and magnetism had been viewed as unrelated phenomena. In 1831, Michael Faraday made the seminal observation that time-varying magnetic fields could induce electric currents and then, in 1864, James Clerk Maxwell published his famous paper "A Dynamical Theory of the Electromagnetic Field".

Once this electromagnetic field has been produced from a given charge distribution, other charged or magnetised objects in this field may experience a force. If these other charges and currents are comparable in size to the sources producing the above electromagnetic field, then a new net electromagnetic field will be produced. Thus, the electromagnetic field may be viewed as a dynamic entity that causes other charges and currents to move, and which is also affected by them. These interactions are described by Maxwell's equations and the Lorentz force law.

Feedback loop
The behavior of the electromagnetic field can be divided into four different parts of a loop:
 the electric and magnetic fields are generated by moving electric charges,
 the electric and magnetic fields interact with each other,
 the electric and magnetic fields produce forces on electric charges,
 the electric charges move in space.

A common misunderstanding is that (a) the quanta of the fields act in the same manner as (b) the charged particles, such as electrons, that generate the fields. In our everyday world, electrons travel slowly through conductors with a drift velocity of a fraction of a centimeter per second and through a vacuum tube at speeds of around 1000 km/s, but fields propagate at the speed of light, approximately 300 000 kilometers (or 186 000 miles) per second. The speed ratio between charged particles in a conductor and field quanta is on the order of one to a million. Maxwell's equations relate (a) the presence and movement of charged particles with (b) the generation of fields. Those fields can then affect the force on, and can then move other slowly moving charged particles. Charged particles can move at relativistic speeds nearing field propagation speeds, but, as Albert Einstein showed, this requires enormous field energies, which are not present in our everyday experiences with electricity, magnetism, matter, and time and space.

The feedback loop can be summarized in a list, including phenomena belonging to each part of the loop:
 charged particles generate electric and magnetic fields
 the fields interact with each other
 changing electric field acts like a current, generating 'vortex' of magnetic field
 Faraday induction: changing magnetic field induces (negative) vortex of electric field
 Lenz's law: negative feedback loop between electric and magnetic fields
 fields act upon particles
 Lorentz force: force due to electromagnetic field
 electric force: same direction as electric field
 magnetic force: perpendicular both to magnetic field and to velocity of charge
 charged particles move
 current is movement of particles
 charged particles generate more electric and magnetic fields; cycle repeats

Mathematical description

There are different mathematical ways of representing the electromagnetic field. The first one views the electric and magnetic fields as three-dimensional vector fields. These vector fields each have a value defined at every point of space and time and are thus often regarded as functions of the space and time coordinates.

If only the electric field (E) is non-zero, and is constant in time, the field is said to be an electrostatic field. Similarly, if only the magnetic field (B) is non-zero and is constant in time, the field is said to be a magnetostatic field. However, if either the electric or magnetic field has a time-dependence, then both fields must be considered together as a coupled electromagnetic field using Maxwell's equations.

With the advent of special relativity, physical laws became susceptible to the formalism of tensors. Maxwell's equations can be written in tensor form, generally viewed by physicists as a more elegant means of expressing physical laws.

The behavior of electric and magnetic fields, whether in cases of electrostatics, magnetostatics, or electrodynamics (electromagnetic fields), is governed by Maxwell's equations. In the vector field formalism, these are:

Gauss's law

Gauss's law for magnetism

Faraday's law

Maxwell–Ampère law

The units used above are the standard SI units. Inside a linear material, Maxwell's equations change by switching the permeability and permittivity of free space with the permeability and permittivity of the linear material in question. Inside other materials which possess more complex responses to electromagnetic fields, these terms are often represented by complex numbers, or tensors.

The Lorentz force law governs the interaction of the electromagnetic field with charged matter.

When a field travels across to different media, the properties of the field change according to the various boundary conditions. These equations are derived from Maxwell's equations.
The tangential components of the electric and magnetic fields as they relate on the boundary of two media are as follows:

 (current-free)

 (charge-free)

The angle of refraction of an electric field between media is related to the permittivity  of each medium:

The angle of refraction of a magnetic field between media is related to the permeability  of each medium:

Properties of the field

Reciprocal behavior of electric and magnetic fields
The two Maxwell equations, Faraday's Law and the Ampère-Maxwell Law, illustrate a very practical feature of the electromagnetic field. Faraday's Law may be stated roughly as 'a changing magnetic field creates an electric field'. This is the principle behind the electric generator.

Ampere's Law roughly states that 'a changing electric field creates a magnetic field'. Thus, this law can be applied to generate a magnetic field and run an electric motor.

Behavior of the fields in the absence of charges or currents
Maxwell's equations take the form of an electromagnetic wave in a volume of space not containing charges or currents (free space) – that is, where  and J are zero. Under these conditions, the electric and magnetic fields satisfy the electromagnetic wave equation:

James Clerk Maxwell was the first to obtain this relationship by his completion of Maxwell's equations with the addition of a displacement current term to Ampere's circuital law.

Relation to and comparison with other physical fields

Being one of the four fundamental forces of nature, it is useful to compare the electromagnetic field with the gravitational, strong and weak fields. The word 'force' is sometimes replaced by 'interaction' because modern particle physics models electromagnetism as an exchange of particles known as gauge bosons.

Electromagnetic and gravitational fields
Sources of electromagnetic fields consist of two types of charge – positive and negative. This contrasts with the sources of the gravitational field, which are masses. Masses are sometimes described as gravitational charges, the important feature of them being that there are only positive masses and no negative masses. Further, gravity differs from electromagnetism in that positive masses attract other positive masses whereas same charges in electromagnetism repel each other.

The relative strengths and ranges of the four interactions and other information are tabulated below:

Applications

Static E and M fields and static EM fields

When an EM field (see electromagnetic tensor) is not varying in time, it may be seen as a purely electrical field or a purely magnetic field, or a mixture of both. However the general case of a static EM field with both electric and magnetic components present, is the case that appears to most observers. Observers who see only an electric or magnetic field component of a static EM field, have the other (electric or magnetic) component suppressed, due to the special case of the immobile state of the charges that produce the EM field in that case. In such cases the other component becomes manifest in other observer frames.

A consequence of this, is that any case that seems to consist of a "pure" static electric or magnetic field, can be converted to an EM field, with both E and M components present, by simply moving the observer into a frame of reference which is moving with regard to the frame in which only the "pure" electric or magnetic field appears. That is, a pure static electric field will show the familiar magnetic field associated with a current, in any frame of reference where the charge moves. Likewise, any new motion of a charge in a region that seemed previously to contain only a magnetic field, will show that the space now contains an electric field as well, which will be found to produce an additional Lorentz force upon the moving charge.

Thus, electrostatics, as well as magnetism and magnetostatics, are now seen as studies of the static EM field when a particular frame has been selected to suppress the other type of field, and since an EM field with both electric and magnetic will appear in any other frame, these "simpler" effects are merely the observer's. The "applications" of all such non-time varying (static) fields are discussed in the main articles linked in this section.

Note that the notion of a "pure" static electric or magnetic field is a picture of classical field theory, which doesn't consider the effects of quantization; It violates the Heisenberg uncertainty relation since there's no uncertainty in any of these static fields.

Time-varying EM fields in Maxwell’s equations

An EM field that varies in time has two "causes" in Maxwell's equations. One is charges and currents (so-called "sources"), and the other cause for an E or M field is a change in the other type of field (this last cause also appears in "free space" very far from currents and charges).

An electromagnetic field very far from currents and charges (sources) is called electromagnetic radiation (EMR) since it radiates from the charges and currents in the source, and has no "feedback" effect on them, and is also not affected directly by them in the present time (rather, it is indirectly produced by a sequences of changes in fields radiating out from them in the past). EMR consists of the radiations in the electromagnetic spectrum, including radio waves, microwave, infrared, visible light, ultraviolet light, X-rays, and gamma rays. The many commercial applications of these radiations are discussed in the named and linked articles.

A notable application of visible light is that this type of energy from the Sun powers all life on Earth that either makes or uses oxygen.

A changing electromagnetic field which is physically close to currents and charges (see near and far field for a definition of "close") will have a dipole characteristic that is dominated by either a changing electric dipole, or a changing magnetic dipole. This type of dipole field near sources is called an electromagnetic near-field.

Changing electric dipole fields, as such, are used commercially as near-fields mainly as a source of dielectric heating. Otherwise, they appear parasitically around conductors which absorb EMR, and around antennas which have the purpose of generating EMR at greater distances.

Changing magnetic dipole fields (i.e., magnetic near-fields) are used commercially for many types of magnetic induction devices. These include motors and electrical transformers at low frequencies, and devices such as metal detectors and MRI scanner coils at higher frequencies. Sometimes these high-frequency magnetic fields change at radio frequencies without being far-field waves and thus radio waves; see RFID tags.
See also near-field communication.
Further uses of near-field EM effects commercially may be found in the article on virtual photons, since at the quantum level, these fields are represented by these particles. Far-field effects (EMR) in the quantum picture of radiation are represented by ordinary photons.

Other 
 Electromagnetic field can be used to record data on static electricity.
 Old televisions can be traced with electromagnetic fields.

Health and safety
The potential effects of electromagnetic fields on human health vary widely depending on the frequency and intensity of the fields.

The potential health effects of the very low frequency EMFs surrounding power lines and electrical devices are the subject of on-going research and a significant amount of public debate. The US National Institute for Occupational Safety and Health (NIOSH) and other US government agencies do not consider EMFs a proven health hazard. NIOSH has issued some cautionary advisories but stresses that the data are currently too limited to draw good conclusions. In 2011, The WHO/International Agency for Research on Cancer (IARC) classified radiofrequency electromagnetic fields as possibly carcinogenic to humans (Group 2B), based on an increased risk for glioma, a malignant type of brain cancer, associated with wireless phone use.

Employees working at electrical equipment and installations can always be assumed to be exposed to electromagnetic fields. The exposure of office workers to fields generated by computers, monitors, etc. is negligible owing to the low field strengths. However, industrial installations for induction hardening and melting or on welding equipment may produce considerably higher field strengths and require further examination. If the exposure cannot be determined upon manufacturers' information, comparisons with similar systems or analytical calculations, measurements have to be accomplished. The results of the evaluation help to assess possible hazards to the safety and health of workers and to define protective measures. Since electromagnetic fields may influence passive or active implants of workers, it is essential to consider the exposure at their workplaces separately in the risk assessment.

On the other hand, radiation from other parts of the electromagnetic spectrum, such as ultraviolet light and gamma rays, are known to cause significant harm in some circumstances.

See also

 Afterglow plasma
 Antenna factor
 Classification of electromagnetic fields
 Electric field
 Electromagnetism
 Electromagnetic propagation
 Electromagnetic tensor
 Electromagnetic therapy
 Free space
 Fundamental interaction
 Electromagnetic radiation
 Electromagnetic spectrum
 Electromagnetic field measurements
 Gravitational field
 International System of Units
 List of environment topics
 Magnetic field
 Maxwell's equations
 Photoelectric effect
 Photon
 Quantization of the electromagnetic field
 Quantum electrodynamics
 Riemann–Silberstein vector

References

Further reading

 
  (This article accompanied a December 8, 1864 presentation by Maxwell to the Royal Society.)
 
  (Chapter 3: sub sections Force, Matter, and the Higgs Field)

External links
 
 On the Electrodynamics of Moving Bodies by Albert Einstein, June 30, 1905.
 On the Electrodynamics of Moving Bodies (pdf)
 Non-Ionizing Radiation, Part 1: Static and Extremely Low-Frequency (ELF) Electric and Magnetic Fields (2002) by the IARC.
 
 National Institute for Occupational Safety and Health – EMF Topic Page
 Biological Effects of Power Frequency Electric and Magnetic Fields (May 1989) (110 pages) prepared for US Congress Office of Technology Assessment by Indira Nair, M.Granger Morgan, Keith Florig, Department of Engineering and Public Policy Carnegie Mellon University
 EMF Assessment (in German) based on EU guidelines 2013/35/EU

Electromagnetism